Highway of Heroes may refer to one of the following roads:

Canada

British Columbia
  British Columbia Highway 1 between Surrey and Abbotsford, part of the Trans Canada Highway

New Brunswick
  New Brunswick Route 2, part of the Trans Canada Highway

Northwest Territories
  Northwest Territories Highway 1, from the Alberta/Northwest Territories border to Enterprise, Northwest Territories

Nova Scotia
  Nova Scotia Highway 111, also known as the  Circumferential Highway ("The Circ")

Ontario
   Ontario Highway 401 between Toronto and Trenton.

Prince Edward Island
 Prince Edward Island Route 1

Saskatchewan
  Saskatchewan Highway 1 between Moose Jaw and Regina, part of the Trans Canada Highway

References